XHEMY-FM is a radio station in Ciudad Mante, Tamaulipas. It broadcasts on 98.7 FM and airs a grupera format known as La Jefa.

History
XEMY-AM 840 received its concession on March 14, 1966. It was a 500-watt daytimer, later increased to 1,000 watts in the 1990s. It moved to FM in December 2011.

External links
 
 radiostationworld.com; List of Tamaulipas radio stations

References

Spanish-language radio stations
Radio stations in Ciudad Mante